Second Spring is a 1970 album by country rock/folk rock musician Ian Matthews' band Matthews Southern Comfort. It was Matthews' second album after his departure from Fairport Convention and was recorded with the touring band he put together following the release of his first solo LP, Matthews' Southern Comfort. It was released on the Uni label in July 1970.

The original vinyl album was reissued on CD by Line Records in Germany in 1993, and a remastered version was released by BGO Records in 1996 as part of a 2-on-1 release with Matthews' Southern Comfort.

Track listing
"Ballad Of Obray Ramsey"  (Ian Matthews) - 2:25
"Moses In The Sunshine"  (Carl Barnwell) - 6:18
"Jinkson Johnson"  (Ian Matthews) - 5:29
"Tale Of The Trial"  (Ian Matthews) - 2:42
"Blood Red Roses"  (Ian Matthews) - 2:27
"Even As"  (Carl Barnwell) - 2:49
"Darcy Farrow"  (Tom Campbell, Steve Gillette) - 3:34
"Something In The Way She Moves"  (James Taylor) - 4:48
"Southern Comfort"  (Sylvia Tyson) - 7:47

Personnel
Ian Matthews - guitar, lead vocals, arranger
Carl Barnwell - guitar, harmony vocals, lead vocal on "Even As"
Mark Griffiths - lead guitar, harmony vocals
Andy Leigh - bass, harmony vocals
Gordon Huntley - steel guitar
Ray Duffy - drums

Guest Musicians 
Tom Paley - banjo
Martin Jenkins - mandolin
Roger Churchyard - violin, fiddle
Byard Ray - fiddle

Production
Production: Ian Matthews and Southern Comfort
Production Coordinator: Steve Barlby
Recording Engineers: Robin Black at Morgan Studios, London on tracks 1, 2, 4, 5, 6 and 9; John Wood at Sound Techniques Studios, London on tracks 3, 7 and 8.
Art Direction: Paul Whitehead
Cover Design: Ian Matthews
Photography: Ray Stevenson

References

Iain Matthews albums
1970 albums
Decca Records albums
Albums recorded at Morgan Sound Studios
Turkish television series endings